Cherry Creek State Park is a state park in Arapahoe County, Colorado, United States. The park consists of a natural prairie and wetland environment with an  reservoir at its center which is shared by powerboats, sailboats, and paddle craft. The Marina at Pelican Bay offers mooring and The Lake House offers event space rental for events on the north-western shore. A large imported-sand swim beach is situated on the north-eastern side along with ample parking. There are facilities for camping, radio-controlled aircraft, picnicking, as well as opportunities for bird watching, cross country skiing, and fishing. The park also contains an outdoor shooting range. There is dock where people can store their boats during the Summer. People can also rent jet skis, paddle boards and kayaks for the day. There is a new updated boat house that has concerts during the summer, serves food and has a bar. The boat house overlooks the water.

Wildlife
More than 40 mammal species roam through the park, including eastern cottontail rabbit, coyote, beaver, muskrat, raccoon, weasel, ground squirrel, mule deer, white-tailed deer, and scampering black-tailed prairie dogs.

History
On August 15, 1993, Cherry Creek State Park was the location for the papal mass of the 8th World Youth Day with Pope John Paul II. The event brought an estimated 500,000 people to the site.

References

External links
 Official website

State parks of Colorado
Protected areas of Arapahoe County, Colorado
Geography of Aurora, Colorado
Protected areas established in 1959
1959 establishments in Colorado